The Leader of the Christian Union is the most senior politician within the Christian Union (CU) in the Netherlands. The post is currently held by Mirjam Bikker, who succeeded Gert-Jan Segers in 2023.

History
The Leaders outwardly act as the 'figurehead' and the main representative of the party. Within the party, they must ensure political consensus. At election time the Leader is always the Lijsttrekker (top candidate) of the party list. Outside election time the Leader can serve as the Opposition leader. In the Christian Union the Leader is often the Parliamentary leader in the House of Representatives. One Christian Union leader became a Minister in a Cabinet.

Deputy Leaders
The Christian Union doesn't have an official designated Deputy Leader in the party's hierarchy but some are given the title as an unofficial description by the media. Because of the often unofficial nature of the position, reliable sources can sometimes differ over who the deputy actually is or was.

See also
Christian Union

References

External links
Official

 

 
 
Christian Union